The China national wushu team represents China in IWUF international competitions. In its entire history, the China national wushu team has never been undefeated on any medal-table in terms of the number of gold medals won.

Roster 
At the most recent World Wushu Championships (2019):

Taolu

Sanda

Competition results

World Wushu Championships 
The International Wushu Federation does not publish all-time medal tables or medal statistics per each national federation. The IWUF only publishes individual championships results and thus the tables below are compilations of those results.

Red border color indicates host nation status.

Most decorated athletes 
Top five athletes. Most athletes are among the 2007 World Wushu Championships delegation, which additionally competed in the 2008 Beijing Wushu Tournament and the wushu event at the 2009 World Games.

References

External links 

 Official website

Wushu in China
National sports teams of China